Valentina Diouf (born 10 January 1993) is an Italian professional volleyball player who played with her national team at the 2014 World Championship.

Life
Diouf was born in Milan, to a father from Senegal and a mother from Italy.

Career
Diouf played with her national team at the 2014 World Championship. There her team ended up in fourth place after losing 2–3 to Brazil the bronze medal match.

Clubs
  Club Italia (2008–2011)
  Volley Bergamo (2011–2014)
  Busto Arsizio (2014–2015)
  LJ Modena (2015–2016)
  Busto Arsizio (2016–2018)
  SESI Vôlei Bauru (2018–2019)
  Daejeon KGC (2019–2021)
  Wealth Planet Perugia Volley (2021–2022)
  ŁKS Commercecon Łódź (2022–present)

Awards

Individuals
 2014-15 CEV Champions League "Best Opposite Spiker"
 2016–17 CEV Cup "MVP"

Clubs
 2011 Italian Supercup –  Champions, with Volley Bergamo
 2014 Italian Cup –  Runner-Up, with Busto Arsizio
 2014–15 CEV Champions League –  Runner-Up, with Busto Arsizio
 2016–17 CEV Cup –  Runner-Up, with Busto Arsizio
 2018 São Paulo State Championship –  Champions, with Vôlei Bauru

References

1993 births
Italian women's volleyball players
Italian people of Senegalese descent
Italian sportspeople of African descent
Living people
Sportspeople from Milan
Mediterranean Games gold medalists for Italy
Competitors at the 2013 Mediterranean Games
Mediterranean Games medalists in volleyball
21st-century Italian women